is a Japanese former footballer and manager. He is the currently head coach of the Cambodia & Cambodia U23. He had previously managed teams in Japan, South Korea, China, and Thailand.

Managerial career

References

1956 births
Living people
Chuo University alumni
Japanese footballers
Association football midfielders
Japan Soccer League players
Shonan Bellmare players
Japanese expatriate sportspeople in South Korea
Expatriate football managers in South Korea
Japanese expatriate sportspeople in Thailand
Expatriate football managers in Thailand
Japanese expatriate sportspeople in Cambodia
Expatriate football managers in Cambodia
Japanese football managers
Japanese expatriate football managers